Radicitus is a Neotropical genus of water scavenger beetle in the family Hydrophilidae represented by three described species known from the Guiana Shield Region.

Taxonomy 
The genus Radicitus was described for the first time by Short & García in 2014.

It belongs in the subfamily Acidocerinae and contains three described species from Guyana, Suriname, and Venezuela.

Description 
Medium-sized beetles (4.5–6.2 mm), moderate to strongly convex in lateral view, dark brown in coloration, with short and stout maxillary palps; reduced hydrofuge pubescence on metafemora. The elytral punctation may present well defined rows of serial punctures. A complete diagnosis was presented by Girón and Short.

Habitat 
Species of Radicitus have been found on a variety of habitats associated with streams and seeps on rock outcrops.

Species 

 Radicitus ayacucho Short and García, 2014: Venezuela
 Radicitus granitum Short and García, 2014: Venezuela
 Radicitus surinamensis Short and García, 2014: Suriname

References 

Hydrophilidae
Insects of South America